The Bank für Kirche und Diakonie eG - KD-Bank (bank for church and deaconry) is a credit institute in Dortmund in the legal form of a listed cooperative. The members are mostly institutions from the area of the Protestant church and its deaconry. The KD-Bank is an expert for all financial questions in this sector. The bank offers private customers the full range of banking services. Its goal is not primarily profit maximization but the economic support of members and customers. The bank is a member in the Bundesverband der Deutschen Volksbanken und Raiffeisenbanken (BVR).

Business
The KD-Bank employs 214 members of staff at the locations Dortmund (headquarter), Berlin, Dresden, Duisburg and Magdeburg. The bank has offices in Mainz, Munich and Nuremberg.

Special offers are: 
 Financial transaction services for donation based organizations 
 Financing of charitable institutions, especially in the area of deaconry
 Long term investments

History
The KD-Bank looks back at a long tradition. The Landeskirchliche Kredit-Genossenschaft Sachsen LKG (today branch of the KD-Bank in Dresden) was founded in 1925 as the first Protestant bank in Germany. In 1927, Protestant loan cooperatives were initiated in Magdeburg and Münster. In 1953 the Rhineland followed. Capacity building, Support of members and a share for members in economic success were the ideas which motivated the founders. In 1927 the capacity building institution Darlehensgenossenschaft der Westfälischen Inneren Mission eGmbH was founded by Martin Niemöller. Victor Rohdich, who since the fall of 1926 served as administrative director of the Inner mission, was also majorly involved in the founding. At the same time a church bank was founded in the province of Saxony under the name of Provinzialkirche Spar- und Darlehensgenossenschaft für die Provinz in Sachsen eGmbH. In Rheinland before World War II people also thought about a church loan fund. But only in June 1953 the Darlehensgenossenschaft der Evangelischen Kirchengemeinde und -Verbände und der kirchlichen Werke im Rheinland eGmbH was founded by Otto Vetter. With the German reunification new business emerged in the new German states which was managed from Berlin and Magdeburg. In two steps a merger with the Prosparda, which was located in Magdeburg, was completed. In 2003 the DGM and the BKD merged and became KD-Bank eG – die Bank für Kirche und Diakonie. Part of the fusion agreement was a new headquarters in the geographical middle of Duisburg and Münster. The winner was Dortmund. Since February 28, 2006 the building in Dortmund is the banks headquarter. On June 9, 2010 the general assembly of the KD-Bank voted for a fusion with the Landeskirchlichen Kredit-Genossenschaft Sachsen eG (LKG) which is headquartered in Dresden. The fusion became retroactive on January 1, 2010. At the same time the general assembly decided on renaming the bank Bank für Kirche und Diakonie eG – KD-BANK. This slight modification of the name is meant to draw the attention of the public to what the bank stands for.

Sustainability filter
As first Protestant church bank and one of only a few banks in Germany the KD-Bank, since January 1, 2008, supports a sustainability filter for financial investments in securities. The sustainability filter is guided by three goals of the conciliar process: peace, justice and the preservation of creation.

References

External links
 Official Website
 FairWorldFonds

Banks of Germany
Companies based in Dortmund
Evangelical Church in Germany
2003 establishments in Germany